The New Roxbury Ironworks Site is a historic industrial archaeological site in Woodstock, Connecticut.  It is the site of a colonial-era iron foundry, established about 1760 in the vicinity of Black Pond.  It was built to process iron ore that had been found by area settlers.  The area was also later the site of grist and saw mills.

The site was listed on the National Register of Historic Places in 1996.

See also
National Register of Historic Places listings in Windham County, Connecticut

References

Industrial buildings and structures on the National Register of Historic Places in Connecticut
Buildings and structures in Windham County, Connecticut
Ironworks and steel mills in the United States
Archaeological sites on the National Register of Historic Places in Connecticut
National Register of Historic Places in Windham County, Connecticut